Kosh-Bulak is a village in Jalal-Abad Region of Kyrgyzstan. It is part of the Toguz-Toro District. Its population was 517 in 2021.

References

Populated places in Jalal-Abad Region